Rinzia communis is a plant species of the family Myrtaceae endemic to Western Australia.

It blooms between July and September producing white-pink flowers.

It is found on hills in the southern Wheatbelt, Great Southern and Goldfields-Esperance regions of Western Australia where it grows in sandy to loamy soils over laterite, granite or limestone.

References

communis
Endemic flora of Western Australia
Myrtales of Australia
Rosids of Western Australia
Plants described in 1986